Kilidülbahir (Turkish for "the key of the sea") is a Turkish village in the Eceabat District of Çanakkale Province, on the peninsula of Gallipoli (northwestern side of the Dardanelles). Its population is 598 (2021).

The fort of Kilitbahir, in the form of a clover, was built by sultan Mehmed II.

See also
Gallipoli Campaign

References 

Villages in Eceabat District